The Coca Codo Sinclair Dam is a hydroelectric dam in Ecuador. It is the largest energy project in Ecuador. The dam was constructed by Sinohydro Corporation for $2.25 billion.

The plant became fully operational in November 2016. It has a capacity of 1,500 megawatts.

Funding of dam

Over the years, China provided $19 billion in the form of loans to Ecuador for the construction of "bridges, highways, irrigation, schools, health clinics and a half dozen dams" as well as the Coca Codo Sinclair dam. According to an article in The New York Times, Ecuador repays its debt to China by providing China with oil "at a discount". By 2018, this meant that China kept 80 percent of oil produced in Ecuador. The loan from China’s Export-Import Bank for the Coca Codo Sinclair Dam amounts to $1.7 billion with an interest rate of 7% interest over 15 years which is $125 million a year in interest alone.

Post construction
In December 2018, 7,648 large and small cracks were identified in the generator hall and in surrounding equipment. The cracks were first discovered in 2014 but the full extent of them is unknown as a thorough assessment would include deconstructing portions of the power plant which is cost prohibitive.

After the dam became operational, its reservoir caused regressive erosion upstream and water absent of sediment released from the dam has caused high rates of erosion downstream which likely led to two oil spills after pipelines along the river lost their footings. Downstream erosion, if left unchecked would undermine the dam and other oil infrastructure by 2022. Additionally, the erosion has also destroyed Ecuador’s largest waterfall and is destroying the village of San Luis.

References

2016 establishments in Ecuador
Buildings and structures in Napo Province
Dams completed in 2016
Dams in Ecuador
Energy infrastructure completed in 2016
Hydroelectric power stations in Ecuador